Īsā Ibn Saʿīd al-Yaḥṣubī (d. 397 AH) (d. 1006 AD) better known as Ibn al-Qaṭṭāʿ, was a 10th-century Andalusi Arab katib and wazir of the Umayyad Caliphate of Córdoba.

Biography 
Ibn al-Qatta' was born in the region of Priego (located in the present-day province of Cordoba) to a family of humble status. They descended from the al-Najjar clan, a branch of an Arab tribe known as Banu al-Jaziri which settled in the Iberian peninsula following the Umayyad conquest. He was the son of a schoolmaster in his native town of Priego. Ibn al-Qatta' was first appointed to the position of vizier during the reign of the Umayyad caliph Hisham II and the de facto ruler of this period, Hisham's chamberlain, Almanzor (d. 1002). Subsequently, Ibn al-Qatta' would continue in his position as a vizier under the rule of Almanzor's successor and son, al-Muzaffar (d. 1008).

References 

People from the Caliphate of Córdoba
10th-century people from al-Andalus
10th-century Arabs
1006 deaths
People from Córdoba, Spain